Reynoutria sachalinensis (giant knotweed or Sakhalin knotweed Japanese オオイタドリ ooitadori, Russian Горец сахалинский, Гречиха сахалинская; syns. Polygonum sachalinense, Fallopia sachalinensis) is a species of Fallopia native to northeastern Asia in northern Japan (Hokkaidō, Honshū) and the far east of Russia (Sakhalin and the southern Kurile Islands).

The species is closely related to the Japanese knotweed, Reynoutria japonica, and can be distinguished from it by its larger size, and in its leaves having a heart-shaped (not straight) base and a crenate margin. Reynoutria sachalinensis has a chromosome count of 2n=44.

Cultivation and uses

The shoots are tender and edible. It was introduced to Europe and grown in many botanic gardens. It came prominently into notice about 1893, when a drought in western Europe caused a decided shortage in forage for cattle. This plant was little affected, and since its tender shoots and leaves were eaten by stock, the plant was widely grown experimentally as a forage crop. It has proved less useful than was predicted, and its deliberate cultivation has been almost entirely abandoned. It has, however, like F. japonica, proved to be an invasive weed in several areas.

It has hybridised with Reynoutria japonica in cultivation; the hybrid, Reynoutria × bohemica (Chrtek & Chrtková) J.P.Bailey, is frequently found in the British Isles and elsewhere.

Extracts of this plant can be used as plant protectants for certain fungal and bacterial diseases.

References

Polygonoideae
Flora of Japan
Plants described in 1859
Edible plants
Forages
Stem vegetables
Flora of the Russian Far East